Ilkley Upstagers' Theatre Group, or simply Upstagers, is a well-known amateur theatre group based in Ilkley, West Yorkshire.

Upstagers perform primarily at Ilkley's King's Hall, Bradford Alhambra and occasionally Guiseley Theatre.  The group is a registered charity (no. 1041989) and received substantial National Lottery funding in the late 1990s to acquire a purpose-built headquarters.  'The Barn' comprises two dance studios, a set and materials workshop and a large wardrobe department.

Reputation
Upstagers have been generally well received by local and national press for over twenty years. Most recently they managed to earn the opportunity to perform "Stars Look Down" from Billy Elliot the Musical as part of the Billy Youth Theatre at the Victoria Palace Theatre in the West End. They met and worked with the resident cast and creatives in doing so. The company's reputation was recognised in 2006 by Sir Cameron Mackintosh, who hand-picked the group to be one of just 12 amateur companies in the UK to stage The Witches of Eastwick fresh from the West End.

Upstagers is renowned locally for producing energetic, spectacular musical theatre to large audiences.  In the past, it has been suggested that the group placed an emphasis upon dance at the expense of strong singing.  However, in the last few years Upstagers' vocal and musical output, bolstered by a strong regular orchestra, see it regarded as one of the all-round leading amateur groups in the north of England.

Alumni
Upstagers is known for having a high standard of youth intake, and members of the company have gone to study at leading drama and dance schools, including The Arts Educational Schools, Mountview Academy of Theatre Arts and Guildford School of Acting, as well as entering the mainstream entertainment industry.

Current members and alumni include:
 Georgie Henley, who starred as Lucy in Walt Disney's film production of The Chronicles of Narnia: The Lion, the Witch, and the Wardrobe and the young Jane in the BBC's adaptation of Charlotte Brontë's Jane Eyre
 Rebecca Louis, currently in the cast of Betty Blue Eyes at London's West-End, who also appeared in the final cast of Oliver!, Cats at the New London Theatre & Mary Poppins.
 Wayne Perry, currently starring as DC Lateef in the BBC's Dalziel and Pascoe, who also appeared in Bombay Dreams at the Apollo Victoria Theatre, London
 Richard Lloyd, star of Carlton Television's The Railway Children and ITV's Band of Gold
 Ellie Sager, lead in the BBC Radio 4's drama production of Charlotte Cory's The Brave New World of Allaetitia
 Lois Taylor and Jack Hanson, stars of BBC Radio 4's drama production of Sharon Oakes' Blind Eye
 Ash Caton, an up-and-coming comedian who has been signed to several live stand-up's around the north of England, and who will be appearing at Edinburgh's comedy festival in 2010.

Official Shows
Upstagers typically put on three main productions a year: Pantomime, running from January into February; the Spring Show in March/April, usually featuring a cast of 11- to 18-year-olds; and Summer Show in July, usually featuring a cast of 18+ year olds. On occasion Upstagers have also put on a play in September/October.  On top of this the group stage several other niche productions in the year, from workshop showcases to Festival Competitions.  An incomplete list of shows performed are as follows:

 2011: Billy Elliot (musical), A Funny Thing Happened on the Way to the Forum (musical), Aladdin (pantomime)
 2010: West Side Story (musical), Return to the Forbidden Planet (musical), Dick Whittington (pantomime)
 2009: Oliver! (musical), Annie  (musical), Mother Goose (pantomime)
 2008: Upstagers' Christmas Spectacular (variety), The Full Monty (musical), Disney's High School Musical (musical), Sinbad (pantomime)
 2007: An Upstagers Christmas! (variety), Biloxi Blues (play), The Wiz (musical), Les Misérables (musical), Beauty and the Beast (pantomime)
 2006: Xmas Showcase! (variety), Stepping Out (play), Billy Liar (musical), The Witches of Eastwick (musical), Babes in the Wood (pantomime)
 2005: Rock Nativity (musical), Summertime Special (variety), Guys and Dolls (musical), Fame (musical), Robinson Crusoe (pantomime)
 2004: The Boy Friend (musical), The Wiz (musical), Red Riding Hood (pantomime)
 2003: Barnum (musical), Godspell (musical), Sleeping Beauty (pantomime)
 2002: 42nd Street (musical), The Demon Headmaster (musical), Jack and the Beanstalk (pantomime)
 2001: Seven Brides for Seven Brothers (musical), Snow White (pantomime)
 2000: Back and Forth (variety), Fame (musical), Mother Goose (pantomime)
 1999: Grease (musical), Aladdin (pantomime)
 1998: Guys and Dolls (musical), Dick Whittington and His Cat (pantomime)
 1997: Oklahoma! (musical)
 1996: A Slice of Saturday Night (musical)
 1995: Anything Goes (musical)
 1994: Sinbad the Sailor (pantomime)
 1993: Joseph and the Amazing Technicolor Dreamcoat (musical)
 1992: Little Shop Of Horrors (musical)
 1991: Grease (musical)
 1990: Godspell (musical)
 1989: The Wiz (musical)
 1988: The Young Ones (musical)
 1987: Tin Pan Ali (musical)

Unofficial Shows
As well as performing shows on a large scale Upstagers also put on performances and shows which are rooted from Upstagers' Dramovox drama, movement and singing classes. These include summer workshops and family performance and a Christmas Showcase. Here is an incomplete list of 'mini-performances' which have taken place over the years.

Summer Workshops 
 2008: Les Misérables
 2007: The Boyfriend
 2006: Guys and Dolls
 2005: Grease
 2004: Joseph and the Amazing Technicoloured Dreamcoat
 2003: Seaspell
 2002: Rats
 2001: Oliver
 2000: Our Day Out

Wharfedale Festival Performances 
Every year Upstagers enter one or more group (s) into the 'Group (under 18's) adaptation and performance of a listed Musical' category. Upstagers have been entering groups since 2002. The first three annual entries won the category which achieved Upstagers their first three Wharfedale #1's (as listed) but were beaten to the top in 2005 by 'Performance' drama and their adaptation of 'Annie'. In 2006 they re-gained their title by achieving their 4th #1 performance then, in 2007 Upstagers reached their peek were they entered two groups into the same category and took the #1 and #2 positions in the category, this was then repeated in 2008 with the addition of winning 3rd, making them the most successful theatre group in Wharfedale History. To date they have six #1 performances, three #2 performances and one #3 performance.

 2009: No Entry.
 2008: High School Musical (#1), Billy Liar (#2), Our Day Out (#3).
 2007: Les Misérables (#1), Annie (#2)
 2006: Bugsy Malone (#1)
 2005: Fiends Reunited (#2)
 2004: Hoodwinked (#1)
 2003: Godspell (#1)
 2002: The Lemonade Kid (#1)

Drama Classes 
 2008: Charlie And The Chocolate Factory
 2007: The Christmas Carol
 2006: Fiends Reunited, Children of Eden
 2005: Hoodwinked, The Christmas Carol

External links
Official website

Amateur theatre companies in England
Ilkley
Culture in West Yorkshire